Benthiocarb is a thiocarbamate cholinesterase inhibitor used as an herbicide. Benthiocarb is almost always used to control the weeds around rice crops, but its effectiveness is not specific to just rice crops. The benthiocarb molecule is an organic molecule containing a phenol bonded to a chlorine atom.

See also
 Thiocarbamate

References

External links
Hazardous Substances Data Bank (source of data)

Herbicides
Thiocarbamates
Chloroarenes